Wakey Wakey is an album by punk band Toy Dolls.

Wakey Wakey may also refer to:

 Wakey Wakey (band), an adult alternative pop group based in Brooklyn, New York.
 Wakey! Wakey!, a GMTV program
 Wakey Wakey Campers, a British reality television game show series
 Wakey! Wakey!, a CITV show
 Wakey Wakey..., a teaser trailer released by the Don't Hug Me I'm Scared channel
 Wakey-Wakey, a Japanese album by NCT 127